The name Juaning was used for three tropical cyclones in the Philippine Area of Responsibility in the Northwestern Pacific Ocean.

 Tropical Storm Morakot (2003) (T0309, 10W, Juaning) – a tropical storm which was recognized as a Category 1-equivalent typhoon by the Joint Typhoon Warning Center (JTWC).
 Severe Tropical Storm Faxai (2007) (T0720, 20W, Juaning) – a short-lived tropical storm that paralleled the Japanese coast. 
 Severe Tropical Storm Nock-ten (2011) (T1108, 10W, Juaning) – another tropical storm which was considered by JTWC as a Category 1-equivalent typhoon; devastated the Bicol Region killing 128 people, and eventually affected northern Luzon, Hainan and northern Vietnam,.

The name Juaning was retired from use in the Philippine Area of Responsibility following the 2011 season, and was replaced by Jenny beginning in 2015.

Pacific typhoon set index articles